Nikolai Radev (29 January 1959 – 15 April 2003), nicknamed The Russian, was a Bulgarian career criminal and mobster who was involved in crime in Melbourne, Australia.

Biography
During his life he was jailed for assault, blackmail, threats to kill, extortion, firearm offences, armed robbery and drug charges. According to police he was an enforcer for the Melbourne head of the Russian mafia, robbing drug dealers.

Radev was shot and killed in Queen St Coburg on 15 April 2003, as part of a series of similar events that are commonly referred to as the Melbourne gangland killings.

He was shot seven times in the head and chest in front of his bodyguard after he stood out from his black Mercedes Benz CLK 500 convertible. A third person in Nik Radev's entourage was driving a light green 2000 Toyota Camry CSI sedan parked directly in front of his Mercedes Benz near the corner of Queen & Reynard Streets, Coburg also witnessed the murder.

Victoria Police told The Age that they believed his death was planned by a father and son drug manufacturing team, and a hitman suspected of four other murders carried out the killing in a red Ford Falcon XR6 Turbo sedan. His associates Damien Cossu and Alfonso Traglia were with Radev at the time of the murder but claimed they could not identify the gunman, and were subsequently named by police as 'persons of interest'.

Despite only having worked for eight months during the 1980s at a fish and chip shop, Radev was killed wearing Versace clothing and a $20,000 watch, and was buried in a gold-plated coffin. Victorian Police suspect that Andrew Veniamin and Carl Williams were behind the killing.

Popular culture
Radev was portrayed by Don Hany in the Australian TV series Underbelly and the subsequent telemovie Underbelly Files: Tell Them Lucifer was Here.

See also
List of unsolved murders

References

External links
Wise guys, tough guys, dead guys John Silvester, The Age 14 December 2003
Why gangland's bloody code is hard to crack  John Silvester, The Age 20 April 2003
Six named in underworld investigations Steve Butcher, The Age 23 December 2003
New lead in Bulgarian Nik's killing John Silvester The Age 13 December 2003

1959 births
2003 deaths
Australian organised crime figures
Bulgarian emigrants to Australia
Bulgarian people imprisoned abroad
Bulgarian people murdered abroad
Bulgarian refugees
Criminals from Melbourne
Deaths by firearm in Victoria (Australia)
Murdered Bulgarian gangsters
Prisoners and detainees of Bulgaria
Unsolved murders in Australia
Victims of the Melbourne gangland killings
People convicted of robbery
People convicted of assault
People convicted of blackmail